The Casa Serena Open was a men's golf tournament on the European Senior Tour. The tournament was held from 2008 to 2011 and was played at Casa Serena Golf, Vidice, near Kutná Hora in the Czech Republic. From 2008 to 2010 the prize money totalled €600,000 but was reduced to €400,000 in 2011.

Winners

External links
Coverage on the European Senior Tour's official site

Former European Senior Tour events
Golf tournaments in the Czech Republic
Recurring sporting events established in 2008
Recurring sporting events disestablished in 2011